Paper Giants: The Birth of Cleo is a 2011 Australian two part television miniseries about the beginning of Cleo magazine and its creator, Ita Buttrose. The series stars Asher Keddie as Buttrose and Rob Carlton as Kerry Packer.

A miniseries sequel, titled Paper Giants: Magazine Wars was screened on ABC1 on 2 June, and 9 June 2013. It features Rachel Griffiths, Mandy McElhinney, Lucy Holmes and Alexander England, (who played Tony Greig in Howzat) assumes the role of a young James Packer.

Plot
The series follows Buttrose as she creates the fashion magazine Cleo, as well the fashion and politics of the period.

Cast and characters
Asher Keddie as Ita Buttrose
Rob Carlton as Kerry Packer
Matt Day as Daniel Ritchie
Jessica Tovey as Leslie Carpenter
Ian Meadows as Andrew Cowell
Maeve Dermody as Rachel Carr
Annie Maynard as Annie Woodham
Tony Barry as Sir Frank Packer
Cheree Cassidy as Ivana Holbrook
Octavia Barron-Martin as Pat Nigra
Olivia Pigeot as Rosina O’Casey
Charlton Hill as Alan Nye
Simon Lyndon as Jack Thompson
Nathan Page as "Mac", Buttrose's husband
 Sahara Jones as Kate, Buttrose's daughter

Reception
Reviews for the show were generally positive. The Sydney Morning Herald said:

Australian TV blog, TV Tonight rated the series with four stars out of five, and commented: 

The program was the subject of defamation proceedings brought against the ABC by the former husband of Buttrose, Alasdair Macdonald, who objected to how he was portrayed in the series. The action was settled out of court in April 2012 when the ABC apologised for what it agreed was an "untrue" portrayal of Macdonald.

Awards and nominations

Christopher Lee also won a Queensland Premier's Literary Award in 2011 for his screenplay.

Ratings
Part one of the miniseries rated over 1.2 million viewers nationally, ranking as the fifth most watched program of the night, and the eighth-most watched program of the week. Part two was watched by 1.346 million viewers in the main five Australian TV markets, ranking as the second-most watched program of the week and the most watched program of the night.

Production
The miniseries was produced by John Edwards (Love My Way, Rush) and Karen Radzyner by Southern Star Entertainment in association with Screen NSW, Screen Australia and ABC TV. The executive producer was Carole Sklan, ABC TV head of fiction; and the script was written by Christopher Lee.

References

External links
Official website

Australian Broadcasting Corporation original programming
Period television series
Television shows set in New South Wales
Fiction set in the 1970s
English-language television shows
2010s Australian television miniseries
2011 Australian television series debuts
2011 Australian television series endings